Jabilu (also Romanized as Jabīlū; also known as Jabalū) is a village in Angut-e Sharqi Rural District, Anguti District, Germi County, Ardabil Province, Iran. At the 2006 census, its population was 212, in 44 families.

References 

Towns and villages in Germi County